The 2005 Volta a la Comunitat Valenciana was the 63rd edition of the Volta a la Comunitat Valenciana road cycling stage race, which was held from 22 February to 26 February 2005. The race started in Calpe and finished in Valencia. The race was won by Alessandro Petacchi of the  team.

General classification

References

Volta a la Comunitat Valenciana
2005 in road cycling
2005 in Spanish sport